Silver Creek is an unincorporated community in Silver Creek Township, Lake County, Minnesota, United States.

The community is located eight miles northeast of the city of Two Harbors at the intersection of Lake County Road 3 (Highway 3) and Township Road 32 (Town Road).

The community is located five miles inland from Lake Superior's North Shore along Lake County 3.

References

 Official State of Minnesota Highway Map – 2011/2012 edition

Unincorporated communities in Lake County, Minnesota
Unincorporated communities in Minnesota